The 2011–12 Liga de Ascenso season is the second-level football league of Mexico.

Changes for the 2011-2012 season

 Alacranes de Durango finished last in the 2010-2011 season and went bankrupt after several financial problems.
 Atlante UTN was renamed Toros Neza.
 Veracruz were suspended after the Clausura 2011 season for not paying players.
 Orizaba were moved to Veracruz and renamed Veracruz.
 Tijuana won promotion to Liga MX.
 Necaxa finished last place in the relegation table in Mexican Primera División and the team was relegated to Ascenso MX.
 Celaya won promotion to Liga de Ascenso from Segunda División de México.
 Mérida FC changed name to FC Mérida and updated logo.
 Lobos de la BUAP changed logo.
 Club Toros Neza changed name to Neza FC and updated logo.
 Indios were suspended after the Apertura 2011 due to financial problems.

Stadia and locations

The following 16 clubs will compete in the Liga de Ascenso during the 2011–12 season:

Torneo Apertura
The 2011 Apertura will be the first championship of the season. It began on 24 July 2011.

Standings

Results

Liguilla

The qualified teams play two games against each other on a home-and-away basis. The winner of each match up is determined by aggregate score.

The teams were seeded two to seven in the quarterfinals, and the winners are joined by the top-ranked team in the semi-finals. The teams are re-seeded one to four in the semifinals, depending on their position in the general table. The higher seeded teams play on their home field during the second leg.

 If the two teams are tied after both legs, the higher seeded team advances.
 Teams are re-seeded every round.
 The winner qualify to the playoff match vs the Clausura 2012 winner. However, if the winner is the same in both tournaments, they would be the team promoted to the 2012–13 Mexican Primera División season without playing the Promotional Final

Top goalscorers
Players sorted first by goals scored, then by last name.

Torneo Clausura
The 2012 Clausura is the second championship of the season. It began on 6 January 2012 & ended on 15 April 2012. Before the 2012 Clausura tournament started, Ciudad Juárez was disaffiliated due to economical problems.

Standings

Results

Liguilla

(Source for Liguilla information)

The qualified teams play two games against each other on a home-and-away basis. The winner of each match up is determined by aggregate score.

The teams ranked 2 to 7 in the regular stage progress to the quarterfinals, whilst the league winners qualify directly to the semi-finals. The higher ranked teams play on their home field during the second leg.

 If the two teams are tied after both legs, the higher seeded team advances.
 The winner qualifies to the Championship Final vs the Apertura 2011 winner.

Quarter-finals

First leg

Second leg

Semi-finals

First leg

Second leg

Final

First leg

Second leg

Promotional Final

First Leg

Second leg

Relegation

Updated on 21 November 2011Source: femexfut.com

References

External links
Official Website

2011–12 domestic association football leagues
2011–12 in Mexican football
2011-12